Hermann is a city in and the  county seat of Gasconade County, Missouri, United States. It has been the county seat since 1842. It is near the center of the Missouri Rhineland and south of the Missouri River. The population was 2,185 at the 2020 census.

The city is the commercial center of the Hermann American Viticultural Area, whose seven wineries produce about one-third of the state's wine. Designated in 1983, it is one of the first federally recognized American Viticultural Areas. The designation recognized the renaissance of an area of vineyards and wineries established by German immigrants during the mid-19th century. Shut down by Prohibition, it began to revive in the 1960s.

Hermann holds a Maifest during the third weekend in May and an Oktoberfest the first four weekends in October. Hermann also calls itself the sausage-making capital of Missouri.

Hermann High School holds the state record for the most girls high school volleyball championships in Missouri.

History

The city was founded by the Deutsche Ansiedlungs-Gesellschaft zu Philadelphia (German Settlement Society of Philadelphia) in 1837. It was promoted by Gottfried Duden, who wrote about the area in his Bericht über eine Reise nach den westlichen Staaten Nord Amerikas (Report of a Journey to the Western States of Northern America). In November 1837, an early group of settlers was led by George Bayer, who bought the land on the behalf of the Society. However, George was waylaid in Pittsburgh due to illness and arrived in Hermann in the spring of 1838 leading another group of families.

The society had almost utopian goals of a "heart of German-America" where it could perpetuate traditional German culture and establish a self-supporting colony built around farming, commerce, and industry. The town is named after Hermann der Cherusker, a Germanic leader who defeated the Romans in the Battle of the Teutoburg Forest in the year 9 AD.  In 2009, Hermann celebrated the 2000th anniversary of the battle, in which the Germanic warrior Hermann defeated three Roman legions.

A bronze statue of the city's namesake was dedicated in the Hermann Park.

Hermann was the nearest town after the Gasconade Bridge train disaster, November 1, 1855.  The Leimer Hotel in Hermann was used as a temporary hospital to treat the wounded.
 
In the 1960s, people began to rebuild the wine industry in the Hermann area.

Today, the vineyards and wineries contribute to the agricultural and heritage tourism economies, with winery tours and wine tastings. Stone Hill Winery, the largest winemaking business in the state and Hermannhof Winery are in the town.  south of town off Missouri Highway 100 West is Adam Puchta Winery, the oldest continuously family-owned winery in the nation, under direct family ownership since 1855.

The Katy Trail, a -long bike path, passes through McKittrick, a town on the northern side of the Missouri River across from Hermann.

The Hermann Historic District, Kotthoff-Weeks Farm Complex, Old Stone Hill Historic District, William Poeschel House, The Rotunda, and Vallet-Danuser House are listed on the National Register of Historic Places.

Demographics

2010 census
As of the census of 2010, there were 2,431 people, 1,047 households, and 614 families residing in the city. The racial makeup of the city was 97.0% White, 0.6% African American, 0.1% Native American, 0.4% Asian, 0.5% from other races, and 1.4% from two or more races. Hispanic or Latino of any race were 1.6% of the population.

There were 1,047 households, of which 25.8% had children under the age of 18 living with them, 45.3% were married couples living together, 9.3% had a female householder with no husband present, 4.1% had a male householder with no wife present, and 41.4% were non-families. 37.2% of all households were made up of individuals, and 20.8% had someone living alone who was 65 years of age or older. The average household size was 2.23 and the average family size was 2.93.

The median age in the city was 44.9 years. 21.5% of residents were under the age of 18; 6.8% were between the ages of 18 and 24; 21.8% were from 25 to 44; 25.4% were from 45 to 64; and 24.4% were 65 years of age or older. The gender makeup of the city was 47.4% male and 52.6% female.

2000 census
As of the census of 2000, there were 2,674 people, 1,149 households, and 698 families residing in the city. The population density was 1,161.5 people per square mile (448.9/km2). There were 1,285 housing units at an average density of 558.2 per square mile (215.7/km2). The racial makeup of the city was 98.80% White, 0.22% African American, 0.07% Native American, 0.07% Asian, 0.30% from other races, and 0.52% from two or more races. Hispanic or Latino of any race were 0.60% of the population.

There were 1,149 households, out of which 27.6% had children under the age of 18 living with them, 48.4% were married couples living together, 9.1% had a female householder with no husband present, and 39.2% were non-families. 36.7% of all households were made up of individuals, and 22.5% had someone living alone who was 65 years of age or older. The average household size was 2.20 and the average family size was 2.87.

In the city, the population was spread out, with 22.4% under the age of 18, 6.4% from 18 to 24, 23.4% from 25 to 44, 21.0% from 45 to 64, and 26.9% who were 65 years of age or older. The median age was 43 years. For every 100 females, there were 83.5 males. For every 100 females age 18 and over, there were 80.4 males.

The median income for a household in the city was $35,634, and the median income for a family was $44,621. Males had a median income of $27,426 versus $20,372 for females. The per capita income for the city was $19,428. About 5.0% of families and 6.7% of the population were below the poverty line, including 7.5% of those under age 18 and 6.9% of those age 65 or over.

Education
Public education in Hermann is administered by Gasconade County R-I School District, which operates two elementary schools, one middle school and Hermann High School.

Hermann has a lending library, a branch of the Scenic Regional Library system.

Notable people
Brock Olivo, former Missouri Tigers and Detroit Lions football player
Ken Boyer, former St. Louis Cardinals third baseman and manager
Richard Honeck, arsonist and murderer, was paroled after serving 64 years
Joe Hoerner, former Major League Baseball pitcher
Charles Radtke, furniture designer
Nathaniel Rateliff, singer and songwriter, Nathaniel Rateliff and the NightSweats

See also

Missouri Rhineland
Deutschheim State Historic Site
Loutre River
Hermanner Volksblatt

References

External links

Official City Government Website
Official Visitors Website
Hermann Area Chamber of Commerce 
School district
Hermann Advertiser-Courier (newspaper)
 Historic maps of Hermann in the Sanborn Maps of Missouri Collection at the University of Missouri Digital Library

German-American history
Cities in Gasconade County, Missouri
Cities in Missouri
Missouri Rhineland
County seats in Missouri
Missouri populated places on the Missouri River
German-American culture in Missouri
Populated places established in 1837
1837 establishments in Missouri